Artabanus II (also spelled Artabanos II or Ardawan II;  Ardawān), incorrectly known in older scholarship as Artabanus III, was King of Kings of the Parthian Empire from 12 to 38/41 AD, with a one-year interruption. He was the nephew and successor of Vonones I. His father was a Dahae prince, whilst his mother was a daughter of the Parthian King of Kings Phraates IV

Before his ascension to the Parthian crown, Artabanus had ruled as king of Media Atropatene, which later served as his base of attacks against the Roman-supported Parthian king Vonones I. Artabanus eventually defeated Vonones I, who fled to Armenia and became its king. Artabanus' efforts to replace Vonones I with his son were blocked by the Romans, who eventually reached an agreement with the Parthians to appoint Artaxias III the new king of Armenia and renounce their support of Vonones I.

Name 
 is the Latin form of the Greek Artábanos, itself from the Old Persian *Arta-bānu ("the glory of Arta."). The Parthian and Middle Persian variant was Ardawān.

Background and kingship of Media Atropatene 
Artabanus was not from the ruling branch of the Arsacid royal family; his father was a Dahae prince, who was most likely descended from the former Parthian monarch Mithridates II, whilst his mother was a daughter of the incumbent Parthian King of Kings Phraates IV. Born between 30–25 BC, Artabanus was raised amongst the Dahae in Central Asia. When he reached adulthood, he became the ruler of Media Atropatene, which occurred sometime during the late reign of Phraates IV or during the reign of the latters son and successor Phraates V. The factor behind Artabanus' rise to kingship of Media Atropatene is unclear. The kingdom served as Artabanus' headquarters of his attacks against the Parthian king Vonones I ( AD), with whom he fought against over the crown. Vonones I, who had originally resided in Rome, had been placed on the Parthian throne by a faction led by the Karin and Suren clans. His rule was supported by the Romans. However, the Parthian nobility was quickly alienated by Vonones I, who had become Romanized during his stay in Rome. This increased Artabanus' odds—after years of fighting—to finally defeat Vonones I, who fled to Armenia and became its king.

Reign 
Artabanus, now the monarch of the Parthian Empire, attempted to depose Vonones I from the Armenian throne and appoint his own son instead. This attempt was instantly opposed by the Romans, who regarded this as posing a danger to their interests. As a result, the Roman emperor Tiberius ( AD) sent his stepson Germanicus to prevent this from happening. However, the Roman general met no resistance from the Parthians.  Instead, Germanicus reached an agreement with Artabanus to appoint Artaxias III the new king of Armenia and renounce their support of Vonones I. The Romans thus acknowledged Artabanus as the legitimate Parthian ruler. In order to ratify the friendly relationship between the two empires, Artabanus and Germanicus met on an island in the Euphrates in 18 AD.

The Romans moved Vonones I to Cilicia, where he was killed the following year after attempting to flee. His death and the now unchallenged dominance of Artabanus split the Parthian nobility, since not all of them supported a new branch of the Arsacid family taking over the empire. In 19/20 AD, the Parthian satrap of Sakastan, Drangiana and Arachosia, named Gondophares, declared independence from Artabanus and founded the Indo-Parthian Kingdom. He assumed the titles of "Great King of Kings" and "Autokrator", demonstrating his new-found independence. Nevertheless, Artabanus and Gondophares most likely reached an agreement that the Indo-Parthians would not intervene in the affairs of the Arsacids.

Artabanus spent the following years increasing his authority. To the north-east, he was victorious in his efforts to have a new dynasty established in Khwarazm, thus starting a new era in the history of the country. Artabanus most likely operated in western Bactria as well, which had been part of the Parthian domains for centuries.

In 35 AD, Artabanus tried again to conquer Armenia and to establish his son Arsaces I as Armenia's king. A war with Rome seemed inevitable. The faction among the Parthian magnates which was hostile to Artabanus II applied to Tiberius for a king who was a descendant of Phraates IV. Tiberius sent Phraates IV's grandson, Tiridates III, and ordered Lucius Vitellius the Elder (the father of the Roman emperor Vitellius) to restore Roman authority in the East. By very dexterous military and diplomatic operations Vitellius succeeded completely. Artabanus II was deserted by his followers and fled to the East.

Tiridates III, who was proclaimed King, could not keep control of the Parthian throne, because he appeared to his subjects to be a vassal of the Romans. In the meantime, Artabanus II returned from Hyrcania with a strong army of Scythian (Dahae) auxiliaries and was again acknowledged by the Parthians. Tiridates III left Seleucia and fled to Syria. Artabanus II wasn’t strong enough for a war with Rome.  He therefore concluded a treaty with Vitellius in 37 AD, in which he gave up all further pretensions towards Armenia. A short time afterwards Artabanus II was deposed again, and Cinnamus was proclaimed king. Artabanus II took refuge with his vassal, the King Izates bar Monobaz.  Izates, by negotiations and the promise of a complete pardon, persuaded the Parthians to restore Artabanus II once more to the throne. Shortly afterwards Artabanus II died and was succeeded by his son, Vardanes I, whose reign was still more turbulent than that of his father.

Artabanus II had four sons: Arsaces I, Orodes, Artabanus, Vardanes I and an adopted son named Gotarzes II.

Mandaeans 
Mandaeans credit a king named Artabanus (Mandaic: Ardban), most likely to be Artabanus II, with helping them escape persecution in Jerusalem and settling in Media during his reign. He is mentioned in the Haran Gawaita, a Mandaean text.

References

Notes

Sources 
 
 
  
  
 
 
 .
 
  (2 volumes)
 .
  
  
  
 
 
 
 
 
 
 
 
 .
 .
 .
 .

Further reading
 

Rulers of Media Atropatene
1st-century Parthian monarchs
38 deaths
1st-century BC births
1st-century Iranian people
1st-century Babylonian kings